Samuel Roukin (ROO-kin; born 15 August 1980) is an English actor and DJ. He is best known for his role as John Graves Simcoe in the series, Turn: Washington's Spies and Simon "Ghost" Riley in Call of Duty: Modern Warfare II.

Early life and education
Roukin was born in Southport, England, and currently lives in Los Angeles. He displayed an interest in drama from an early age. He completed secondary school at Merchant Taylors' School, Crosby where he was involved in many school productions. He goes back to the school to give acting workshops to pupils involved in drama and English. Roukin went on to train at the Bristol Old Vic Theatre School, graduating in 2003. Roukin finished filming Bright Star, directed by Jane Campion and based on the three-year romance between 19th century poet John Keats and Fanny Brawne.

Career
Roukin starred in the 2008 film Happy-Go-Lucky as the love interest of the main character, Poppy (played by Sally Hawkins).

ITV's two-part drama pilot for the television series DCI Banks had Roukin portraying one half of a serial killing couple.

Roukin later portrayed a detective in the ITV1 Drama Appropriate Adult, a two-part dramatization exploring the aftermath of the capture of serial killers Fred West and Rosemary West.

He played Bagot in Richard II, part of the cultural Olympiad of Shakespeare, directed by Rupert Goold and produced by Sam Mendes for BBC2 and NBC.

Roukin also portrayed British Lieutenant-Colonel John Graves Simcoe, one of the main antagonists of the 2014 AMC series Turn: Washington's Spies, a period drama about American Revolutionary War spies.

In 2022, Roukin revealed on Twitter that he would play the role of Simon "Ghost" Riley in Call of Duty: Modern Warfare II, replacing Jeff Leach.

Filmography

Film

Stage

Television

Video Games

References

External links

1980 births
English male film actors
English male television actors
Living people
People from Kentish Town
People from Southport
Male actors from Lancashire
People educated at Merchant Taylors' Boys' School, Crosby